Hashim Gadoev (born May 10, 1937) is a Soviet, Tajik theater and film actor, theater director, teacher, writer. Gadoev was awarded People's Artist of the USSR in 1988.

Biography 
Hashim Gadoev was born on May 10, 1937, in Kulab (now in the Khatlon Region, Tajikistan).

He graduated from the Russian Institute of Theatre Arts in 1960.

Since 1961 he is an actor and director of the Tajik Drama Theater named after I. A. Lakhuti located in Dushanbe. Member of the Union of Cinematographers of the Tajik SSR (1972).

Awards 
 People's Artist of the Tajik SSR (1979)
 People's Artist of the USSR (1988)
 USSR State Prize (1987) — for the title role in the play "Oedipus" by Sophocles on the stage of the Tajik State Academic Theater named after A. A. Lakhuti.
 State Prize of the Tajik SSR named after Rudaki (1973) — for the role of Suhrab in the film "Rustam and Suhrab".
 Anahita Name Award (1995)
 Order "Star of the President of Tajikistan"

Filmography 
 
 1963 – Twelve hours of life — Kamil
 1964 – Ulugbek's star — prince Abdal-Latif Mirza
 1967 – Fugitive
 1965 – Born in a thunderstorm — episode
 1969 – Exposure — Базайшо
 1971 – Here is the border — Turkan
 1971 – Rustam and Suhrab — Suhrab
 1972 – Hurricane in the valley — Yarmatov
 1972 – Four from Chorsang — Maqsud
 1973 – Wrestlers
 1974 – Border
 1975 – The last hunt (short film)
 1975 – The light of extinguished bonfires — Gaza-khan
 1977 – Siege — Niyaz
 1977 – Nasruddin's first love — Talgatbek
 1978 – A woman from afar — Sasha Rasulov
 1980 – Serving the Fatherland — Bobo Peshtuni
 1982 – Paradise won't meet you here — Black Vortex
 1982 – Awakening — Kudrat
 1983 – Knights of the Black Lake — Quli
 1984 – State border. Red sand — Muminbek
 1987 – Jura – hunter from Min-Arhar — Ibrahimbek
 1990 – Battle of the Three Kings — Agat Mara
 1995 – The call of the ancestors. Sogdiana — Ikhshid Gurak, ruler of Sogdiana.

References

External links
 

1937 births
Soviet actors
Tajikistani actors
Soviet male actors
Soviet theatre directors
Soviet writers
Tajikistani writers
People's Artists of the USSR
Recipients of the USSR State Prize
People's Artists of Tajikistan
Living people